The Garden of Folly is a work of satire, published by Stephen Leacock in 1924.

Quotations from the book are still cited as of 2017, used to illustrate the deceptive nature of advertising  and the fake news cycle. 

The prosperity of the 1920s and Prohibition serve as targets of the author’s satire in this and other novels (including "Winnowed Wisdom" (1926), "Short Circuits" (1928), "The Iron Man and the Tin Woman" (1929)), contrasting with the period of disillusionment after World War I.

Critical reception
"Taken piecemeal, Stephen Leacock's fun becomes the real humor of all sorts of things that we take with over-ponderous seriousness. "The Garden of Folly", under this acceptance, becomes a true garden through which we walk delighted and refreshed."

References

1924 books
Books by Stephen Leacock
Satirical books